Planview is a global enterprise software company headquartered in Austin, Texas.

History

The company was founded in 1989 in Austin, Texas, by Patrick Durbin. In 1997, the company launched its complete web-based resource and project portfolio management (PPM) software, Planview Enterprise. In 2010, the company moved to the cloud to offer software as a service (SaaS) products.

Ownership 
In December 2013, Insight Venture Partners acquired a substantial interest in Planview.

In January 2017, Thoma Bravo acquired Planview, becoming the majority shareholder.

In December 2020, Planview was acquired by TPG Capital and TA Associates for $1.6 billion.

Acquisitions 
In August 2014, Planview acquired Projectplace, a Stockholm-based project collaboration company.

In May 2015, Planview acquired Troux Technologies, an Austin-based enterprise architecture management software company.

On August 1, 2016, the company announced its acquisition of San Francisco-based Innotas.

In December 2017, Planview acquired LeanKit.

In December 2018, Planview acquired Spigit.

In July 2020, Planview acquired Aptage.

In February 2021, Planview acquired Clarizen and Changepoint.

In May 2022, Planview acquired Tasktop, a Vancouver-based value stream management company.

Awards

See also

 Comparison of project management software

References

External links
 

American companies established in 1989
Companies based in Austin, Texas
Cloud applications
Privately held companies based in Texas
Software companies based in Texas
1989 establishments in Texas
Software companies of the United States